International Maritime Institute (also known as IMI) is a private marine engineering college in Greater Noida, Uttar Pradesh, India. It was founded in 1991.

History
IMI was established in 1991.

Courses

Pre Sea Courses 
 Diploma in Nautical Sciences
 B Tech in Marine Engineering
 Graduate Marine Engineering
 IMU-CET Preparatory Course (for Class 12th PCM Students)
 Electro technical officer (ETO)

Post Sea Courses 
 2nd MATE Function Courses
 ROSC
 ARPA
 RANSCO
 STSDSD
 TOTA
 Refresher PST
 Refresher FPFF
 Augmentation of FPFF
 Basic Training for Oil and Chemical Tanker Cargo Operations (BTOCTCO)

Other courses
 STCW Course
 Value Added Courses

References

External links 
 Official Website

Maritime colleges in India
Universities and colleges in Noida
Educational institutions established in 1991
1991 establishments in Uttar Pradesh